K. J. Rao (born 1942) was an advisor to the Indian Election Commission. He was an election observer for 2005 Bihar elections.

Career
K. J. Rao was a member of the investigation team that probed the malpractices in Amethi, the constituency of late Rajiv Gandhi, in 1989. He retired in 2002 but continued with the commission in various capacities. He also helped in weeding out bogus names from electoral lists in West Bengal.

He also refuted the claims of tampering with electronic voting machines (EVM) in 2009.

References

Living people
Election people
1942 births